The Roman Catholic Archdiocese of Semarang is a Metropolitan Latin archdiocese on Java in Indonesia, yet it depends on the missionary Roman Congregation for the Evangelization of Peoples.

Its cathedral archiepiscopal see is Katedral Santa Perawan Maria Ratu Rosario Suci, dedicated to Our Lady of the Rosary, in the city of Semarang, Jawa Tengah.

Statistics and extent 
As per 2012, it pastorally administered 499,200 Catholics (2.4% of 20,812,000 total) on 21,196 km² in 98 parishes and 10 missions with 383 priests (174 diocesan, 209 religious), 1,914 lay religious (737 brothers, 1,177 sisters) and 60 seminarians.

It comprises parishes on the central and eastern part of Central Java - stretching from Kendal, Temanggung, Magelang to the east- as well as the Special Region of Yogyakarta province.

History 
 Established on June 25, 1940 as the Apostolic Vicariate of Semarang, on territory split off from the then Apostolic Vicariate of Batavia
 January 3, 1961: Promoted as Metropolitan Archdiocese of Semarang
 It enjoyed a Papal visit from Pope John Paul II October 1989.
The first Roman Catholic mission in this Archdiocese was established in 1640 when two Dominican priests, Manuel de St Maria, O.P. and Pedro de St Joseph, O.P., acquired land from Sultan of Mataram to minister Portuguese Catholic merchants in Jepara. The earliest mission dispersed as persecution of Catholics by Netherlands' colonial government. In 1807, Lambertus Prinsen set up and administered a parish at Semarang as Semarang was still part of Apostolic Prefecture of Batavia. In 1818, Prinsen appointed to become Apostolic Prefect of Batavia. The Semarang parish then administered by two parish priest successors. At 1859, Ambarawa became a new outstation by the coming of Jesuit priests. In 1865, a new outstation in Yogyakarta was created, followed by Magelang outstation. At 1904, Fransiskus Georgius Josephus van Lith, S.J., established a school for teachers in Muntilan and the spread of new teachers made Roman Catholic Church developed across Central Java and even for the whole Java Island. A minor seminary was founded in Muntilan in 1911 then moved to Mertoyudan.

In 1936, a major seminary was established in Yogyakarta.

Ecclesiastical province 
Its suffragan sees are :
 Roman Catholic Diocese of Malang
 Roman Catholic Diocese of Purwokerto
 Roman Catholic Diocese of Surabaya

Ordinaries

Apostolic Vicar of Semarang
 Albertus Soegijapranata, S.J. (1940-1961)

Archbishops of Semarang
 Albertus Soegijapranata, S.J. (1961-1963)
 Cardinal Justinus Darmojuwono (1963-1981)
 Cardinal Julius Darmaatmadja, S.J. (1983-1997), appointed Archbishop of Jakarta
 Cardinal Ignatius Suharyo Hardjoatmodjo (1997-2009), appointed Archbishop of Jakarta
 Johannes Pujasumarta (2010-2015)
 Robertus Rubiyatmoko (2017–present)

See also 
 List of Catholic dioceses in Indonesia

References

Sources and external links 
 GCatholic.org - data for all sections
 Catholic Hierarchy
 Archdiocesan website

Semarang
Roman Catholic dioceses in Indonesia
Religious organizations established in 1940
Roman Catholic dioceses and prelatures established in the 20th century